The Statesboro Herald is a newspaper published one day a week located in Statesboro, Georgia, United States. Owned by Morris Multimedia, it has a circulation of about 5,300, and primarily serves Bulloch, Screven, Evans, and Candler counties.
The Herald was named best small daily newspaper by the Georgia Press Association in 2004, 2006, 2010, 2011, and 2012.

The newspaper's website, statesboroherald.com , was named "Best Newspaper Website" by the National Newspaper Association in 2009. Known for its innovation in online video and audio programming, the website was also awarded first place in General Excellence by the Inland Press Association's New Frontiers Contest in 2010, and was named 2010 Best Newspaper Website by the Georgia Press Association.  During 2012, The Statesboro Herald is celebrating its 75th Anniversary. The newspaper is managed by the Operations Manager Jim Healy, who also holds the title of Executive Editor.

References

External links
 The Statesboro Herald

Morris Multimedia
Newspapers published in Georgia (U.S. state)
Bulloch County, Georgia